Stachyacanthus is a monotypic genus of flowering plants belonging to the family Acanthaceae. The only species is Stachyacanthus riedelianus.

The species is found in Western Central Brazil.

References

Acanthaceae
Acanthaceae genera
Monotypic Lamiales genera